Den Lille Nøttefabrikken is a Norwegian nut and dried fruit company.

It was established in the late 1990s by Bjørn Holmsen with its production facility at Hauketo. Holmsen had formerly founded, and sold, the company Nøttolf. Den Lille Nøttefabrikken packs nuts and dried fruit which are sold in small bags or in bulk. It grew with 30% during its first year from 1999 to 2000. It was bought by Brynild Gruppen in 2003, and the production was moved to Fredrikstad in 2006.

References

Food and drink companies of Norway
Food and drink companies established in 1999
Manufacturing companies based in Oslo       
Companies based in Fredrikstad
1999 establishments in Norway